Gustavo Emilio Méndez Techera (born 3 February 1971) is a Uruguayan former footballer who played as a defender. He played for several clubs, including Nacional (Uruguay), Vicenza Calcio (Italy) and Torino FC (Italy). Whilst at Vicenza he won the 1996–97 Coppa Italia. For the Uruguay national football team Méndez was a participant at the 2002 FIFA World Cup.

Honours
Vicenza
Coppa Italia: 1996–97

References

External links
  Profile

1971 births
Living people
Uruguayan footballers
Club Nacional de Football players
L.R. Vicenza players
Torino F.C. players
Uruguayan Primera División players
Serie A players
Serie B players
Uruguayan expatriate footballers
Expatriate footballers in Italy
Uruguay international footballers
2002 FIFA World Cup players
1997 FIFA Confederations Cup players
1995 Copa América players
Footballers from Montevideo
Copa América-winning players
Association football defenders